Ukrainskiy Retail, Ukr Український Рітейл, is one of the biggest retail chains in Ukraine, represented by 86 stores in the Eastern Ukraine.

About the company
"Ukrainskiy Retail" was established on 13 September 2006. The company is headquartered in Donetsk. 
Ukrainskyi Retail ensures trade operations with a chain of retail "corner-shop" stores under Brusnytsya (eng. Cranberry) brand. The first Brusnytsya store was opened in March 2007 in Donetsk.  
As of October 2011, Ukrainskiy Retail employed around 3000 people and Brusnytsya had 86 stores in the towns of Eastern Ukraine region.
In September 2011 Brusnytsya shops were restyled to the new format of fresh-markets Brusnychka
Dmitriy Kulik is the CEO of Ukrainskiy Retail.

Awards

In September 2011 the company won the National Award «Private Label – 2011», in the category "Best contribution to the development of the product category"

References

External links
 Official homepage
 Rating of the biggest retail chains in Ukraine (rus)

See also 

 List of supermarkets

Retail companies of Ukraine
Ukrainian brands
Retail companies established in 2006
Companies based in Donetsk